On Solid Ground  is an album by Larry Carlton, released in 1989. The album also features keyboardists Terry Trotter and Alan Pasqua, and occasionally saxophonist Kirk Whalum.

Track listing
All songs written by Larry Carlton, except where noted.

"Josie" (Walter Becker, Donald Fagen) 5:08
"All in Good Time" 8:39
"The Philosopher" 4:06
"Layla" (Eric Clapton, Jim Gordon) 4:06
"On Solid Ground" 4:19
"The Wãffer" 6:36
"Bubble Shuffle" 4:32
"Chapter II" 4:48
"Honey Samba" 5:06
"Sea Space" 6:27

Personnel
 Larry Carlton – lead guitar, bass guitar, keyboards
 Kirk Whalum – saxophone
 David Foster – keyboards
 Rhett Lawrence – keyboards
 Brian Mann – keyboards
 Alan Pasqua – keyboards
 Terry Trotter – keyboards
 Dean Parks – rhythm guitar
 Nathan East – bass guitar
 Abraham Laboriel – bass guitar
 John Peña – bass guitar
 Rick Marotta – drums
 John Robinson – drums
 Paulinho da Costa – percussion
 Michael Fisher – percussion

References

1989 albums
Larry Carlton albums
MCA Records albums